The Minister of defense is the head of the Ministry of Defense and is responsible for the Lao People's Armed Forces.

List of officeholders

Kingdom of Laos (1953–1975)

Lao People's Democratic Republic (1975–present)

References